William Shockley (1910–1989) was a British-born American physicist and Nobel Prize winner for co-inventing the transistor.

William Shockley may also refer to:

 Bill Shockley (1937–1992), American footballer
 William R. Shockley (1918–1945), Medal of Honor recipient
 William Shockley (actor) (born 1963), American actor and musician
 William Hillman Shockley, American mining engineer and plant collector, father of William Bradford Shockley